Board of Ecclesiastical Commissioners may refer to:
 Ecclesiastical Commissioners of England and Wales
 Ecclesiastical Commissioners of Ireland